The State Minister of Artsakh is a political post in the Republic of Artsakh. The position was introduced after constitutional amendments, which were approved in a constitutional referendum in 2017, and after the Prime Minister of Artsakh post was abolished.

The current State Minister is Gurgen Nersisyan.

List of State Ministers of Artsakh

See also 

 Government of Artsakh
 President of Artsakh

References

External links 

 The Government of the Republic of Artsakh

Executive branch of the government of the Republic of Artsakh